Gershon Baskin (born in New York City in 1956) since August 2021 is the Director of the Holy Land Bond (a company registered in the UK) a new investment fund aimed at investing in housing projects for Palestinians in East Jerusalem, integrated housing projects for Jewish and Palestinian citizens of Israel in Israel's "mixed cities" and employment and industrial zones that are either cross boundary Israeli Palestinian, or for Jewish and Palestinian citizens of Israel. 

Baskin was the founder and former co-chairman of IPCRI - Israel/Palestine Center for Research and Information (later renamed Israel Palestine Creative Regional Initiatives), dedicated to the resolution of the Israeli–Palestinian conflict on the basis of a "two-states for two peoples" solution. He is a social and political activist and a researcher of the Israeli–Palestinian conflict and peace process. Baskin founded IPCRI in March 1988 and served as its Co-Director until January 2012. Baskin is a columnist for The Jerusalem Post. His weekly column is also published in Arabic in the Jerusalem Al Quds daily newspaper. He describes himself as a social and political entrepreneur. Baskin's writings and video recordings are archived on his website.

Biography 
In his youth, Baskin became involved in the civil rights movement and the anti–Vietnam War movement. In 1978, Baskin received his BA from New York University in the politics and history of the Middle East. He received his MA (1992) and Ph.D. (1994) from Greenwich University. His Ph.D. dissertation was on "Sovereignty and Territory in the Future of Jerusalem:, In September 1978, he made aliyah (immigrated to Israel) under the auspices of the Interns for Peace program. From 1979 to 1981 he was a community worker in Kafr Qara, a Palestinian Arab village in Israel. In 1982, Baskin served in the Israeli Ministry of Education as coordinator of education for co-existence between the Jewish and Arab school systems. In 1983, under the auspices of the Prime Minister's office and the Ministry of Education, Baskin founded and directed the Institute for Education for Jewish Arab Coexistence, which was funded by the Hanns Seidel Foundation. In March 1988, Baskin founded IPCRI - Israel/Palestine Center for Research and Information and served as its co-director until January 2012. In mid-1989, Baskin launched three Israeli-Palestinian working groups: Economics and Business, the Future of Jerusalem, and the water experts working group. In October 1992, Baskin initiated a series of secret meetings in London with former Israeli security officers and Palestinian officials from the PLO. These talks laid down the framework for subsequent security undertaking in the Oslo Accords of September 1993. In 1994, Baskin became an outside adviser on the peace process to a secret team of intelligence officers established by Prime Minister Yitzhak Rabin. In 24 years as Co-Director of IPCRI, together with Zakaria al Qaq (for 14 years) and with Mr. Hanna Siniora (for 10 years), Baskin organised, led, facilitated, negotiated and mediated more than 2000 working group meetings of Israeli and Palestinian professionals covering every subject imaginable connecting Israeli and Palestinian societies. The subjects included: security, border management, economy and business, agriculture, regional tourism, water, environment, peace education and more. Baskin, together with other Israelis and Arabs, had worked for years to secure peace between Israelis and Arabs and had many Arab contacts.
Baskin is a certified mediator (Gishur Israel) and also certified by Prof. Lawrence Susskind, Director Public Dispute Program Harvard Law School, in the Theory and Practice of Third Party Intervention in Intractable International Conflicts. Baskin also completed a 200 hour course through the Consensus Building Institute (Cambridge Ma.) Negotiation and Mediation Training for Environmental Professionals.

Baskin and Gilad Shalit 

In July 2006, six days after Gilad Shalit was abducted in Gaza, Baskin unofficially opened a back channel with Hamas. Three months later Baskin successfully got Hamas to deliver a hand written letter from Shalit to his parents which was brought to the Office of the Egyptian Government in Gaza. He continued his behind the scenes efforts to negotiate a deal between Israel and Hamas throughout the five years and four months that Shalit was in captivity. He became the official intermediary between senior Hamas officials and Israeli envoy David Meidan in April 2011. Baskin's main interlocutor in Hamas was Deputy Foreign Minister Ghazi Hamad. Baskin was involved in efforts to secure Shalit's release for more than five years. Baskin's efforts are detailed in his book The Negotiator: Freeing Gilad Schalit from Hamas.

Continued talks with Hamas 

Immediately after Shalit's return, Baskin and Hamad began discussing the possibility of negotiating a long-term ceasefire agreement between Israel and Hamas. On 1 May 2012, Baskin presented the fourth draft of the proposed agreement to Israeli Defense Minister Ehud Barak. Barak formed a high level committee, composed of officials from the security establishment, to discuss the proposal. After two months, the committee decided against entering into a formal agreement with Hamas even if, as proposed, it were negotiated and formalized through the Egyptian General Intelligence Directorate. In October 2012, Baskin initiated another round of talks to reach a ceasefire—this time with Ahmed Jabari, the head of the Izz ad-Din al-Qassam Brigades, through Hamad. In November 2012, Baskin and Hamad met in Cairo, where they spoke with Egyptian intelligence officers and discussed possible long-term ceasefire arrangements. On 14 November 2012, Hamad met with Jabari and was planning to send a copy of a proposed ceasefire agreement to Baskin but later that day Israel killed Jabari in an air strike and started Operation Pillar of Defense. Baskin and Hamad remain in contact.

Baskin after IPCRI 

Since stepping down as co-director of IPCRI on 31 December 2011, Baskin became the co-chairman of the Board of IPCRI until April 2018. He remains a member of the Board of IPCRI.  He was a member of the steering committee of the Israeli Palestinian Peace NGO Forum until 2016, a member of the Board of Directors of ALLMEP – the Alliance for Middle East Peace, also until 2016, and was a member of the Israeli Board of One Voice Movement. He remains a member of the editorial committee of the Palestine Israel Journal. In 2012 Baskin was a library fellow at the Van Leer Jerusalem Institute.  In 2013 Baskin began working as a consultant to a USAID project through Deloitte Emerging Markets, The Trade Project, aimed at developing the Palestinian private sector, increasing trade and decreasing the cost of trade until 2015. Today Baskin works on advancing renewable energy projects in Palestine and in Egypt as country manager for Palestine and Egypt in Gigawatt Global, an American owned Dutch renewable energy company developing solar energy mainly in Africa. Baskin also writes a weekly political column in the Jerusalem Post under the title "Encountering Peace" also published in Arabic in Al Quds daily newspaper and in Hebrew on the website.

In 2019 Baskin together with a Palestinian colleague opened an Israeli registered company United GH Ltd. that works in the field of medical innovations and devices and is focusing its business in the Arab world.

In July 2016 Baskin began teaching a summer course for international students and diplomats on Coexistence in the Middle East at the Rothberg International School at the Hebrew University of Jerusalem.  In the summer 2020 the course was canceled due to the Corona Pandemic.  The course will resume in the summer 2021.

Awards 

Baskin has been awarded:
 The Histadrut Prize for Peace in 1996
 The Turkish Foreign Policy Institute Peace Prize in 2004
 The Tribute of Honor and Courage from the World Movement for Democracy in 2004
 The Search for Common Ground Journalist Award for Middle East Journalism named for Lova Eliav and Issam Sartawi in 2005 and 2007
 The Ordine Della Stella Della Solidarieta Italiana by the President of Italy in 2007.

Publications (books) 

Baskin has published thousands of oped articles in many publications.
 Baskin, G. "In Pursuit of Peace in Israel and Palestine" Vanderbilt University Press, 2017  https://www.vanderbilt.edu/university-press/book/9780826521811
 Baskin G., Geva O. and Praver L. "At the Crossroads", The Institute for Education for Jewish-Arab Coexistence and the Van Leer Institute, May 1985.
 Baskin G., Abu Namir M. and Nasser I, "My Responsibility - To Myself and My Community", The Institute for Education for Jewish Arab Coexistence, Autumn 1987 (Arabic).
 Baskin G. "Water - Conflict or Cooperation", (Ed.) Israel/Palestine Issue Of Conflict, Issues For Cooperation, Volume 1, Number 2. May 1992. IPCRI.
 Baskin G. "A Model Agreement for the Interim Period: Palestinian Self Rule", Revised Edition. Israel/Palestine Issues in Conflict, Issues for Cooperation. Volume 1, Number 3, June 1992. IPCRI.
 Baskin G. and Twite R. (eds.) "The Future of Jerusalem, Proceedings of the First Israeli-Palestinian Seminar on the Future of Jerusalem", IPCRI, March 1993.
 Baskin G. and Twite R. (eds.) "The Conversion of Dreams, The Development of Tourism in the Middle East", IPCRI, November 1994
 Baskin G. and Smith T. (eds.) "Handbook for Palestinian Businesses, How to Conduct Business in the Palestinian Territories", January 1996, The Small Business Support Project, DAI, USAID.
 Huleileh S., Feiler G., Baskin G. and al Qaq Z. (eds.) "Guidelines for Final Status Economic Negotiations Between Israel and Palestine", IPCRI Commercial Report Series, November 1998.
 Baskin G. and al Qaq Z. (eds.) "Israeli-Palestinian-Jordanian Trade: Present Issues, Future Possibilities", IPCRI, April 1998.
 Baskin G. and al Qaq Z. "A Reevaluation of the Border Industrial Estates Concept", IPCRI Commercial Report Series, December 1998.
 Baskin G. and al Qaq Z. (eds.) "Creating a Culture of Peace" IPCRI, January 1999.
 Baskin G., "Jerusalem of peace: Sovereignty and territory in Jerusalem's future", IPCRI, 1994
 Baskin G., "New thinking on the future of Jerusalem: a model for the future of Jerusalem : scattered sovereignty: the IPCRI plan", 1994
 Baskin G. "The Future of the Israeli Settlements in Final Status Negotiations: A Policy Paper Featuring Recommendations for Negotiations in the Final Status Talks Between Israel and the Palestinians", IPCRI, 1997
 Baskin G., "Yes PM – Years of Experience in Strategies of Peace Making", IPCRI 2002
 Baskin G., The Negotiator: Freeing Gilad Schalit from Hamas, Toby Press, Jerusalem 2013,

References

External links 
Gaza Symposium: Is reconstruction for demilitarisation the way forward?, Fathom: For a deeper understanding of Israel and the region, 7 August 2014
Gaza Symposium: Reconstruction for Demilitarisation? - Fathom Journal

1956 births
American emigrants to Israel
American Zionists
Israeli activists
Israeli columnists
Israeli Jews
Living people
Jewish American community activists
American civil rights activists
Alumni of the University of Greenwich
New York University alumni
Activists from New York City
Israeli–Palestinian peace process
21st-century American Jews